Eleanor Barooshian (April 2, 1950 – August 30, 2016), also known as Eleanor Baruchian and as Chelsea Lee, was a member of the band the Cake (formed in New York in 1966). In 1967, Barooshian appeared in You Are What You Eat, a documentary film produced by Peter Yarrow of folk group Peter, Paul & Mary. In the film, Barooshian performed the Sonny & Cher hit "I Got You Babe" with Tiny Tim. She sang the male part while Tiny sang the female. Yarrow cast them after seeing them perform at Steve Paul's The Scene in New York.

Following the break-up of the Cake in 1968, Barooshian and fellow Cake member Jeanette Jacobs toured with Dr John and subsequently moved to the UK, where they became part of Ginger Baker's Air Force. Barooshian also recorded an album in Japan with Tetsu Yamauchi.

The Kevin Ayers song "Eleanor's Cake (Which Ate Her)" from the LP Joy of a Toy (1970) was written about Barooshian.

She died on August 30, 2016 at the age of 66.

References

American expatriates in the United Kingdom
American pop musicians
1950 births
2016 deaths
People from Weehawken, New Jersey
Singers from New Jersey
Singers from London